William Herbert Johnson (4 June 1916 – 30 June 2009), was an English football player, manager, and coach who played as a wing half in the Football League. He played in both the 1946 FA Cup Final for Charlton Athletic.

Matt Gillies brought Johnson on as a coach at Leicester City in 1959. He was originally signed as head scout, but soon become Gillies' assistant manager. He was influential in the signing of both Dave Gibson and Mike Stringfellow, both of whom would become key figure in Leicester's success during the 1960s. Johnson is often credited as having come up with a tactical innovation of switching the positions of Frank McLintock and Graham Cross, upsetting the traditional 1-11 formation. This hugely influenced Liverpool manager Bill Shankly.

Gillies said on the innovation: "confused opposition" as opposition players would often be asked to mark "our [Leicester's] number eight, so they thought Cross was their man, when McLintock had replaced him" as "players hadn't got beyond thinking about numbers then."

References

External links

1916 births
2009 deaths
Footballers from Stockton-on-Tees
Footballers from County Durham
English footballers
Association football wing halves
Spennymoor United F.C. players
Charlton Athletic F.C. players
Welling United F.C. players
Cambridge United F.C. players
English Football League players
English football managers
Welling United F.C. managers
Cambridge United F.C. managers
FA Cup Final players